The Bellecôte is a mountain in the Vanoise Massif in the Graian Alps, lying in the northern part of the Vanoise National Park and dominating the Peisey-Nancroix valley in Savoie. The north face is immense and austere, whereas the south face is more accessible.

The resort of La Plagne lies on one side of the Bellecôte.

See also
 List of mountains of the Alps

References

External links
 "Sommet de Bellecôte" on Summitpost
 "Bellecôte" on Mountain-Forecast

Alpine three-thousanders
Mountains of Savoie
Mountains of the Graian Alps